Colin Alexander Snedden (7 January 1918 – 24 April 2011) was a New Zealand Test cricketer. 

His father, Nessie Snedden, and brother, Warwick Snedden, both played first-class cricket; Warwick's son, Martin Snedden, played in 25 Tests and 93 One Day Internationals for New Zealand.

Cricket career
Born in Auckland, Snedden played first-class cricket for the Auckland cricket team. A tall and strongly built man who bowled quick off-breaks, he played one match before the Second World War, then resumed his career eight seasons later in 1946–47. He took five wickets against Otago then eight wickets against Canterbury, including 6 for 59 off 34 overs in the second innings. 

He was selected for the single Test for New Zealand against England, at Christchurch in March 1947. Five other New Zealanders made their debut in the same match. New Zealand declared their first innings at 345 for 9; Snedden was the number 11 batsman so did not bat. He bowled 16 overs, but the third and fourth days were washed out, and the match was abandoned as a draw.

He played a few matches in two more seasons before retiring.

Later life and death
Following his retirement from playing, Snedden was a radio commentator on cricket and rugby for many years.

On the death of Eric Tindill on 1 August 2010, Snedden became the oldest surviving New Zealand Test cricketer. On 24 April 2011, he died in his sleep at the age of 93.

See also
 List of Auckland representative cricketers
 One-Test wonder

References

External links

 Colin Snedden at Cricket Archive
 Colin Snedden's obituary

New Zealand Test cricketers
New Zealand cricketers
Auckland cricketers
New Zealand cricket commentators
1918 births
2011 deaths
North Island cricketers
Colin